3960 Chaliubieju, provisional designation , is a stony asteroid from the central regions of the asteroid belt, approximately 9 kilometers in diameter. It was discovered on 20 January 1955, by astronomers at the Purple Mountain Observatory in Nanjing, China. The asteroid was named after Cha Liubieju, a friend of one of the discoverers.

Orbit and classification 

Chaliubieju is an asteroid of the main belt's background population that does not belong to any known asteroid family. It orbits the Sun in the central main-belt at a distance of 1.9–3.4 AU once every 4 years and 3 months (1,568 days). Its orbit has an eccentricity of 0.28 and an inclination of 14° with respect to the ecliptic.

The body's observation arc begins at Nanjing, two days after its official discovery observation.

Physical characteristics 

Chaliubieju is an assumed S-type asteroid.

Rotation period 

In February 2011, a rotational lightcurve of Chaliubieju was obtained French amateur astronomer Pierre Antonini. Lightcurve analysis gave a rotation period of 3.986 hours with a brightness variation of 0.27 magnitude. One month later another photometric observation at the Astronomical Research Observatory gave a concurring period of 3.984 hours and an amplitude of 0.30 magnitude.

Diameter and albedo 

According to the survey carried out by the NEOWISE mission of NASA's Wide-field Infrared Survey Explorer, Chaliubieju measures between 7.13 and 9.00 kilometers in diameter  and its surface has an albedo between 0.288 and 0.34, while the Collaborative Asteroid Lightcurve Link assumes an albedo of 0.10 and calculates a diameter of 14.57 kilometers based on an absolute magnitude of 12.3.

Naming 

This minor planet was named after Cha Liubieju, a friend of one of the discovering astronomers at the Purple Mountain Observatory. Liubieju is noted for her social work with sick and destitute mothers and children in China. The official naming citation was published by the Minor Planet Center on 5 October 1998.

References

External links 
 Asteroid Lightcurve Database (LCDB), query form (info )
 Dictionary of Minor Planet Names, Google books
 Asteroids and comets rotation curves, CdR – Observatoire de Genève, Raoul Behrend
 Discovery Circumstances: Numbered Minor Planets (1)-(5000) – Minor Planet Center
 
 

003960
003960
Named minor planets
19550120